is a city located in Ishikari, Hokkaido, Japan. "Kita" is the Japanese word for "north", so the town's name, Kitahiroshima-shi, is translated as "North-Hiroshima city" or "city of North-Hiroshima".

As of April 30, 2017, the city has an estimated population of 58,918, with 27,221 households, and the density of 500 persons per km2.

History
On September 1, 1996, Hiroshima town was reorganized to promote city status, but Hiroshima city already existed, on the west of Honshu island. Therefore, Hiroshima was renamed to Kitahiroshima on that day.
1884: 25 families, 107 people migrated from Hiroshima.
1894: Hiroshima village was founded.
1968: Hiroshima village became Hiroshima town.
1996: Hiroshima town became Hiroshima city and was renamed Kitahiroshima.

Education

Universities

Private 
  (Seisa Dohto University Official website（星槎道都大学公式サイト）)

High schools

Public
 Hokkaido Kitahiroshima High School
 Hokkaido Kitahiroshima Nishi High School

Private
 Sapporo Nihon University High School

Transportation

Rail
Chitose Line: Kita-Hiroshima

Road
It is accessed by routes 36, 274 and the expressway interchange in the west. In 1981, the bypass of route 274 was opened and the bypass of route 36 was opened in 1986. The urban sprawl of the Sapporo area in the western part of the city is bypassed.

Sports 
There are currently no professional sports teams in Kitahiroshima. But, ES CON Field Hokkaido is currently under construction, and it will be the future home of the Hokkaido Nippon-Ham Fighters. They will move from Sapporo to Kitahiroshima once the stadium opens in March 2023.

The Sapporo-Eniwa Cycle Road follows the route of the decommissioned Chitose Railway Line from Sapporo City to Kitahiroshima, making it suitable for recreational and professional cyclists alike.

Near the Kitahiroshima Classe Hotel, tennis and golf are popular summer activities, while skiing and tobogganing is available in the winter months.

Mascot 

She is from Shimamatsu, Kitahiroshima (it is the same place where rice farmer Kuzo Nakayama studied the science of cold rice). As a result, she can communicate with not just the ghost of Kuzo Nakayama's but also the ghosts of other people. She is the mascot of the Kitahiroshima City Society of Commerce and Industry. However, as a result of her getting a resident card, she became the mascot of the whole city as a whole. She likes running on Elfin Road while researching nature. Though sporty, she does not do fast reflexes. Her hair is her charm point. As red is her favourite colour, she collects red ribbons. She has a sweetooth and her favourite sweet is strawberry cream puff.

Twinnings
 Higashihiroshima, Hiroshima Prefecture

Notable people
 Satoru Noda

References

External links 

Official Website 

Cities in Hokkaido